Giggs  may refer to:

People
 Margaret Giggs (1508–1570), otherwise Margaret Clement, adopted daughter of Sir Thomas More
Rebecca Giggs, Australian nonfiction writer
 Ryan Giggs (b. 1973), retired Welsh footballer
 Giggs (rapper) (b. 1983), English rapper

Places
 Giggs Hill Green, an area of common ground in Thames Ditton, England

See also
 Gigg (disambiguation)